Nutreco N.V. is a Dutch producer of animal nutrition, fish feed and processed meat products. It has about 100 production facilities in more than 30 countries, and eight research centers. The company was founded in 1994 after a Cinven-backed management buyout of the feed and nutrition division of BP. Nutreco was listed on Euronext Amsterdam from 1997 until 2015, when the company was delisted following its acquisition by SHV Holdings.

References

Manufacturing companies of the Netherlands
Food and drink companies of the Netherlands